Baccaurea lanceolata is a species of plant in the family Phyllanthaceae. It is found in Malaysia, Indonesia and Thailand.

References

External links
 

lanceolata
Flora of Malesia
Flora of Thailand